Guy Hubert Georges Lacombe (born 12 June 1955) is a French football manager and former professional player.

Playing career 
Lacombe was a member of the French squad that won the gold medal at the 1984 Summer Olympics in Los Angeles, California. He played for Albi, Nantes, Lens, Tours, Toulouse, Rennes, Lille and Cannes.

Coaching career 
As manager of Sochaux, Lacombe led the club to two UEFA Cup qualifications before leaving in July 2005. On 27 December that year, he was appointed by Paris Saint-Germain, who had dismissed Laurent Fournier while in sixth place. In his first match on 4 January 2006, he won 3–1 at the Parc des Princes against his former employers. Despite falling to 9th by the end of the season, PSG won the Coupe de France final 2–1 against Le Classique rivals Marseille to clinch a UEFA Cup place.

At the start of the 2006–07, season Lacombe dropped France international midfielder Vikash Dhorasoo – one of the goalscorers in the cup final win – who reacted by publicly criticising him in an interview for L'Équipe. PSG chairman Alain Cayzac sacked Dhorasoo in October 2006. It was the first case of a Ligue 1 player being dismissed by his employer. On 15 January 2007, with PSG only one place above the relegation zone, Lacombe was shown the door and replaced by Paul Le Guen.

On 17 December 2007, Lacombe returned to Ligue 1, taking over from Pierre Dréossi at a Rennes team that had fallen from 3rd to 13th after six straight defeats. Having come 6th and 7th respectively in his two seasons, and lost the 2009 Coupe de France Final 2–1 to Derby Breton rivals Guingamp.

Lacombe signed a two-year deal with AS Monaco on 2 June 2009, replacing the Brazilian Ricardo Gomes. In his first season with the team from the principality, he led them to the 2010 Coupe de France Final, lost to his former team PSG via a single Guillaume Hoarau goal in extra time. He was sacked on 10 January 2011 after the team were eliminated from the last 64 of the season's cup on penalties to fifth-tier Chambéry.

On 7 November 2012, Lacombe moved abroad for the first time in his football career, joining Al-Wasl F.C. in the United Arab Emirates. He was recommended by their previous coach, compatriot Bruno Metsu, who took leave due to his stomach cancer diagnosis. The following 18 February he was sacked off the back of a 4–0 loss to Al-Ahli with the team in 9th; he won two of his nine fixtures.

Lacombe became a director for the French Football Federation on 1 October 2013. He retired on 3 October 2017.

Honours

Player 
Nantes
 Ligue 1: 1977

France
 Olympic gold medal: 1984

Coach 
Cannes
 Coupe Gambardella: 1995

Sochaux
 Coupe de la Ligue: 2004
 Coupe de la Ligue finalist: 2003

Paris Saint-Germain
 Coupe de France: 2006

Rennes
 Coupe de France finalist: 2009

Monaco
 Coupe de France finalist: 2010

References

1955 births
Living people
People from Villefranche-de-Rouergue
Sportspeople from Aveyron
Association football forwards
French footballers
French football managers
Olympic footballers of France
Olympic gold medalists for France
Footballers at the 1984 Summer Olympics
FC Nantes players
RC Lens players
Tours FC players
Toulouse FC players
Stade Rennais F.C. players
Lille OSC players
AS Cannes players
AS Cannes managers
Toulouse FC managers
En Avant Guingamp managers
FC Sochaux-Montbéliard managers
Paris Saint-Germain F.C. managers
Stade Rennais F.C. managers
AS Monaco FC managers
Al-Wasl F.C. managers
Ligue 1 managers
Expatriate football managers in the United Arab Emirates
Olympic medalists in football
US Albi players
Medalists at the 1984 Summer Olympics
Ligue 1 players
Footballers from Occitania (administrative region)